The 2026 Winter Paralympics, officially known as the XIV Paralympic Winter Games, and commonly known as Milano-Cortina 2026, is an international winter multi-sport event for disabled athletes that is scheduled to take place in Milan and Cortina d'Ampezzo, Italy, from 6 to 15 March 2026. The election was held on 24 June 2019 at the 134th IOC Session in Lausanne, Switzerland, home of the IOC headquarters. Milan-Cortina were elected as hosts, defeating Stockholm-Åre.

This will be the third Paralympic Games hosted in Italy and will mark the 20th anniversary of the 2006 Winter Paralympics in Turin.

Sports
Six Winter Paralympic sports are expected.

Venues
The venues for the Games are below.

Milan Cluster
 PalaLido – ice sledge hockey
 Piazza del Duomo – medal plaza and closing ceremonies

Val di Fiemme Cluster
Lago di Tesero Cross Country Stadium, Tesero – biathlon, cross-country skiing

Cortina d'Ampezzo Cluster
 Olimpia delle Tofane slope, Cortina d'Ampezzo – alpine skiing, snowboarding
 Stadio Olimpico Del Ghiaccio, Cortina – wheelchair curling

Verona
 Verona Arena – opening ceremony

Marketing

Emblem
The emblem is the "Futura" emblem, announced after an online vote on 30 March 2021.

Mascot(s)
To be unveiled in 2024.

See also
 2026 Winter Olympics
 1960 Summer Paralympics
 2006 Winter Paralympics

References

External links 
 Official website - MilanoCortina2026 Foundation

 
2026 in Italian sport
2026 in multi-sport events
Paralympics,Winter
Multi-sport events in Italy
Scheduled multi-sport events
Sports competitions in Milan